Francis Baasen (September 30, 1829 – January 10, 1901) was an American Democratic politician and the first Secretary of State of Minnesota 1858–1860.

Born in Luxembourg, Baasen studied law in Milwaukee, Wisconsin and then moved to New Ulm, Minnesota. Baasen served in the Minnesota Territorial House of Representatives in 1857. He also served in the Minnesota Constitutional Convention of 1857. He was then elected the first Secretary of State of Minnesota and served 1858–1860. During the American Civil War, Baasen served in the 1st Minnesota Volunteer Infantry. Baasen served in the Minnesota House of Representatives in 1872. He died in Minneapolis, Minnesota.

Notes

1829 births
People from New Ulm, Minnesota
People of Minnesota in the American Civil War
Members of the Minnesota Territorial Legislature
19th-century American politicians
Democratic Party members of the Minnesota House of Representatives
Secretaries of State of Minnesota
1901 deaths
American people of Luxembourgian descent